Errol Brown (1943–2015) was a British-Jamaican singer and songwriter.

Errol Brown may also refer to:

Errol Brown (engineer), Jamaican audio engineer
Errol Brown (cricketer) (born 1952), Jamaican cricketer

See also
Erroll M. Brown, United States Coast Guard admiral